St. John's Episcopal Hospital was founded in 1871 as a sectarian hospital. It was later known as St. John's Hospital of Brooklyn, 1545 Atlantic Avenue, in the Bedford-Stuyvesant neighborhood of Central Brooklyn, and became a major teaching affiliate of the State University of New York Downstate Medical School. In 1982 they merged with the larger Brooklyn Jewish Hospital and Medical Center,
forming Interfaith Medical Center. After severe financial difficulties, Interfaith closed. Both sites became apartments.

References

Hospitals in Brooklyn